Liver kidney microsomal type 1 antibody is an autoantibody associated with autoimmune hepatitis. It is one of the several subtypes of anti–liver-kidney microsome antibodies that are known. The frequent association of anti-LKM-1 antibodies and hepatitis C virus (HCV) infections and the probable existence of an infectious and autoimmune form of anti-LKM-1-associated hepatitis, requiring different therapeutical strategies, necessitates the exact determination of anti-LKM-1 specificities.

References

Autoantibodies